Achtheres percarum is a species of arthropod belonging to the family Lernaeopodidae.

Synonym:
 Achtheres sibirica Messjatzeff, 1928

References

Siphonostomatoida